A Named Lecture is a lecture delivered usually at a predefined frequency and it is associated with a name of a person of outstanding significance to the subject the lecture is concerned with. Such lectures exist for a number of branches of Science and Engineering and they commemorate individuals who have made significant contribution to the subject.

Science

Mathematics

Physics

Computer Science/Information Technology

 Wheeler Lecture

Engineering

Civil Engineering

 BGA Rankine Lecture
  ASCE Terzaghi Lecture
 Coulomb Lecture
 BGA Géotechnique Lecture
 GS Glossop Lecture
 ICE SECED Mallet-Milne Lecture
 AGS Poulos Lecture

Mechanical Engineering

 ASME Timoshenko Lecture

Electrical Engineering

Religion and Philosophy

Gifford Lectures
John Locke Lecture
Neal A Maxwell Lecture
Howison Lecture in Philosophy
Lowell Lectures
Tanner Lectures on Human Values

References

Organized events
Academic conferences